There are at least 16 members of the geranium, impatiens and wood sorrel order, Geraniales, found in Montana. Some of these species are exotics (not native to Montana) and some species have been designated as Species of Concern.

Geranium

Family: Geraniaceae
Erodium cicutarium, stork's bill
Geranium bicknellii, Bicknell's geranium
Geranium carolinianum, Carolina crane's-bill
Geranium molle, dove's-foot crane's-bill
Geranium pusillum, small-flower crane's-bill
Geranium richardsonii, Richardson's geranium
Geranium robertianum, Robert geranium
Geranium viscosissimum, sticky geranium
Geranium viscosissimum var. incisum, sticky purple geranium
Geranium viscosissimum var. viscosissimum, sticky purple geranium

Impatiens
Family: Balsaminaceae
Impatiens aurella, pale-yellow jewel-weed
Impatiens ecalcarata, spurless touch-me-not

Meadow-foam
Family: Limnanthaceae
Floerkea proserpinacoides, false mermaidweed

Woodsorrel

Family: Oxalidaceae
Oxalis corniculata, creeping woodsorrel
Oxalis dillenii, Dillen's woodsorrel
Oxalis stricta, common yellow wood-sorrel

Further reading

See also
 List of dicotyledons of Montana

Notes

Montana
Montana